"I'll Be There for You" is a song by Canadian pop rock band The Moffatts. It was released in April 1998 as the first single from their third album, Chapter I: A New Beginning. The song was a hit in Canada, reaching No. 5 on Canada's singles chart and peaked at No. 25 on the RPM Adult Contemporary chart.

Music video
The music video was directed by Lionel Martin and premiered in 1998. The video features the Moffatts performing in a garage on a stormy day. Their garage band performance is being watched in various locations: in the living room of a young couple while they eat popcorn; in the bedroom of a girls' slumber party; and through the window of a pawn shop. The video ends with the Moffatts walking to the pawn shop windows where they notice their performance.

Track listing 
 "I'll Be There For You" (Radio Edit) – 3:39
 "I'll Be There For You" (Long Version) – 4:16
 "I'll Be There For You" (Instrumental) – 3:39
 "Now And Forever" - 3:18

Chart positions

References

1998 singles
The Moffatts songs
EMI Records singles